In addition to the televised episodes of Doctor Who starring Sylvester McCoy, the Seventh Doctor has appeared in a number of spin-off media.

Audio dramas
The Sirens of Time (An Adventure related by the Character the 7th Doctor) (1999)
The Fearmonger (An Adventure related by the Characters the 7th Doctor & Ace) (2000)
The Genocide Machine (An Adventure related by the Characters the 7th Doctor & Ace) (2000)
The Fires of Vulcan (An Adventure related by the Characters the 7th Doctor & Mel Bush) (2000)
The Shadow of the Scourge (An Adventure related by the Characters the 7th Doctor, Ace & Benny) (2000)
Last of the Titans (An Adventure related by the Character the 7th Doctor) (2001)
Dust Breeding (An Adventure related by the Characters the 7th Doctor & Ace) (2001)
Colditz (An Adventure related by the Characters the 7th Doctor & Ace) (2001)
Death Comes to Time (An Adventure related by the Character the 7th Doctor) (2001)
Excelis Decays (An Adventure related by the Character the 7th Doctor) (2002)
The Rapture (An Adventure related by the Characters the 7th Doctor & Ace) (2002)
Bang-Bang-a-Boom! (An Adventure related by the Characters the 7th Doctor & Mel) (2002)
The Dark Flame (An Adventure related by the Characters the 7th Doctor & Ace) (2003)
Project: Lazarus (An Adventure related by the Character the 7th Doctor) (2003)
Flip-Flop (An Adventure related by the Characters the 7th Doctor & Mel) (2003)
Master (An Adventure related by the Character the 7th Doctor) (2003)
Zagreus (An Adventure related by the Characters the 7th Doctor) (2003)
The Harvest (An Adventure related by the Characters the 7th Doctor, Ace & Hex) (2004)
Dreamtime (An Adventure related by the Characters the 7th Doctor, Ace & Hex) (2005)
Unregenerate! (An Adventure related by the Characters the 7th Doctor & Mel) (2005)
LIVE 34 (An Adventure related by the Characters the 7th Doctor, Ace & Hex) (2005)
Night Thoughts (An Adventure related by the Characters the 7th Doctor, Ace & Hex) (2006)
The Settling (An Adventure related by the Characters the 7th Doctor, Ace & Hex) (2006)
Red (An Adventure related by the Characters the 7th Doctor & Mel) (2006)
No Man's Land (An Adventure related by the Characters the 7th Doctor, Ace & Hex) (2006)
Return of the Daleks (An Adventure related by the Character the 7th Doctor) (2007)
Nocturne (An Adventure related by the Characters the 7th Doctor, Ace & Hex) (2007)
Valhalla (An Adventure related by the Character the 7th Doctor) (2007)
Frozen Time (An Adventure related by the Character the 7th Doctor) (2007)
The Dark Husband (An Adventure related by the Characters the 7th Doctor, Ace & Hex) (2008)
The Death Collectors & Spider's Shadow (An Adventure related by the Character the 7th Doctor) (2008)
Kingdom of Silver & Keepsake (An Adventure related by the Character the 7th Doctor) (2008)
Forty-five (An Adventure related by the Characters the 7th Doctor, Ace & Hex) (2008)
The Prisoner's Dilemma (An Adventure related by the character Ace) (2009)
The Magic Mousetrap (An Adventure related by the Characters the 7th Doctor, Ace & Hex) (2009)
Enemy of the Daleks (An Adventure related by the Characters the 7th Doctor, Ace & Hex) (2009)
The Angel of Scutari (An Adventure related by the Characters the 7th Doctor, Ace & Hex) (2009)
Bernice Summerfield and the Criminal Code (An Adventure related by the character Benny) (2010)
A Thousand Tiny Wings (An Adventure related by the Characters the 7th Doctor & Klein) (2010)
Survival of the Fittest & Klein’s Story (An Adventure related by the Characters the 7th Doctor & Klein) (2010)
The Architects of History (An Adventure related by the Characters the 7th Doctor & Klein) (2010)
Project Destiny (An Adventure related by the Characters the 7th Doctor, Ace & Hex) (2010)
A Death in the Family (An Adventure related by the Characters the 7th Doctor, Ace & Hex) (2010)
Lurkers at Sunlight's Edge (An Adventure related by the Characters the 7th Doctor, Ace & Hex) (2010)
The Four Doctors (An Adventure related by the Character the 7th Doctor) (2010)
Thin Ice (An Adventure related by the Characters the 7th Doctor & Ace) (2011)
Crime of the Century (An Adventure related by the Characters the 7th Doctor, Ace & Raine) (2011)
Animal (An Adventure related by the Characters the 7th Doctor, Ace & Raine) (2011)
Earth Aid (An Adventure related by the Characters the 7th Doctor, Ace & Raine) (2011)
Robophobia (An Adventure related by the Character the 7th Doctor) (2011)
The Doomsday Quatrain (An Adventure related by the Character the 7th Doctor) (2011)
House of Blue Fire (An Adventure related by the Character the 7th Doctor) (2011)
Protect and Survive (An Adventure related by the Characters the 7th Doctor, Ace & Hex) (2012)
Black and White (An Adventure related by the Characters the 7th Doctor, Ace & Hex) (2012)
Gods and Monsters (An Adventure related by the Characters the 7th Doctor, Ace & Hex) (2012)
Project: Nirvana (An Adventure related by the Character the 7th Doctor) (2012)
Love and War (An Adventure related by the Characters the 7th Doctor, Ace & Hex) (2012)
UNIT Dominion (Adventures related by the Characters the 7th Doctor, Klein & Raine) (2012)
The Shadow Heart (An Adventure related by the Character the 7th Doctor) (2012)
Destiny of the Doctor: Shockwave (An Adventure related by the Character Ace) (2013)
Persuasion (An Adventure related by the Characters the 7th Doctor, Klein & Will) (2013)
Starlight Robbery (An Adventure related by the Characters the 7th Doctor, Klein & Will) (2013)
Daleks Among Us (An Adventure related by the Characters the 7th Doctor, Klein & Will) (2013)
The Light at the End (An Adventure related by the Characters the 7th Doctor & Ace) (2013)
1963: The Assassination Games (An Adventure related by the Characters the 7th Doctor, Ace & Counter Measures) (2013)
Afterlife (An Adventure related by the Characters the 7th Doctor, Ace & Hex) (2013)
The New Adventures of Bernice Summerfield Volume 1 (Adventures related by the Characters the 7th Doctor, Ace & Benny) (2014)
Revenge of the Swarm (An Adventure related by the Characters the 7th Doctor, Ace & Hex) (2014)
Mask of Tragedy (An Adventure related by the Characters the 7th Doctor, Ace & Hex) (2014)
Signs and Wonders (An Adventure related by the Characters the 7th Doctor, Ace & Hex) (2014)
The Highest Science (An Adventure related by the Characters the 7th Doctor & Benny) (2014)
Damaged Goods (An Adventure related by the Characters the 7th Doctor, Chris Cwej & Roz Forrester) (2015)
The Defectors (An Adventure related by the Characters the 7th Doctor & Jo Grant) (2015)
The New Adventures of Bernice Summerfield Volume 2: The Triumph of Sutekh (Adventures related by the Characters the 7th Doctor, Ace & Benny) (2015)
We are the Daleks (An Adventure related by the Characters the 7th Doctor & Mel) (2015)
The Warehouse (An Adventure related by the Characters the 7th Doctor & Mel) (2015)
Terror of the Sontarans (An Adventure related by the Characters the 7th Doctor & Mel) (2015)
All-Consuming Fire (An Adventure related by the Characters the 7th Doctor, Ace & Benny) (2015)
Theatre of War (An Adventure related by the Characters the 7th Doctor, Ace & Benny) (2015)
You are the Doctor and Other Stories (An Adventure related by the Characters the 7th Doctor & Ace) (2015)
Nightshade (An Adventure related by the Characters the 7th Doctor & Ace) (2016)
The Two Masters (An Adventure related by the Character the 7th Doctor) (2016)
A Life of Crime (An Adventure related by the Characters the 7th Doctor, Ace & Mel) (2016)
Harvest of the Sycorax (An Adventure related by the Character the 7th Doctor) (2016)
Fiesta of the Damned (An Adventure related by the Characters the 7th Doctor, Ace & Mel) (2016)
Maker of Demons (An Adventure related by the Characters the 7th Doctor, Ace & Mel) (2016)
Original Sin (An Adventure related by the Characters the 7th Doctor, Benny, Chris & Roz) (2016)
Cold Fusion (An Adventure related by the Characters the 7th Doctor, Chris & Roz) (2016)
Shadow Planet/World Apart (An Adventure related by the Characters the 7th Doctor, Ace & Hex) (2017)
The High Price of Parking (An Adventure related by the Characters the 7th Doctor, Ace & Mel) (2017)
The Blood Furnace (An Adventure related by the Characters the 7th Doctor, Ace & Mel) (2017)
The Silurian Candidate (An Adventure related by the Characters the 7th Doctor, Ace & Mel) (2017)

Short Trips audios
Police and Shreeves
Critical Mass
Seven to One
The Riparian Ripper
The Shadow Trader
Dark Convoy
Washington Burns
The Hesitation Deviation

Novels and short stories

Virgin New Adventures
Timewyrm: Genesys by John Peel
Timewyrm: Exodus by Terrance Dicks
Timewyrm: Apocalypse by Nigel Robinson
Timewyrm: Revelation by Paul Cornell
Cat's Cradle: Time's Crucible by Marc Platt
Cat's Cradle: Warhead by Andrew Cartmel
Cat's Cradle: Witch Mark by Andrew Hunt
Nightshade by Mark Gatiss
Love and War by Paul Cornell
Dragons' Wrath by Justin Richards featuring Bernice Summerfield without the doctor
Transit by Ben Aaronovitch
The Highest Science by Gareth Roberts
The Pit by Neil Penswick
Deceit by Peter Darvill-Evans
Lucifer Rising by Andy Lane and Jim Mortimore
White Darkness by David A. McIntee
Shadowmind by Christopher Bulis
Ship of Fools by Dave Stone featuring Bernice Summerfield without the doctor
Birthright by Nigel Robinson
Iceberg by David Banks
Blood Heat by Jim Mortimore
The Dimension Riders by Daniel Blythe
The Left-Handed Hummingbird by Kate Orman
Conundrum by Steve Lyons
No Future by Paul Cornell
Tragedy Day by Gareth Roberts
Legacy by Gary Russell
Theatre of War by Justin Richards
All-Consuming Fire by Andy Lane
Blood Harvest by Terrance Dicks
Strange England by Simon Messingham
First Frontier by David A. McIntee
St Anthony's Fire by Mark Gatiss
Falls the Shadow by Daniel O'Mahony
Parasite by Jim Mortimore
Warlock by Andrew Cartmel
Set Piece by Kate Orman
Infinite Requiem by Daniel Blythe
Sanctuary by David A. McIntee
Human Nature by Paul Cornell
Original Sin by Andy Lane
Sky Pirates! by Dave Stone
Zamper by Gareth Roberts
Toy Soldiers by Paul Leonard
Head Games by Steve Lyons
The Also People by Ben Aaronovitch
Shakedown by Terrance Dicks
Just War by Lance Parkin
Warchild by Andrew Cartmel
SLEEPY by Kate Orman
Death and Diplomacy by Dave Stone
Happy Endings by Paul Cornell
GodEngine by Craig Hinton
Christmas on a Rational Planet by Lawrence Miles
Return of the Living Dad by Kate Orman
The Death of Art by Simon Bucher-Jones
Damaged Goods by Russell T Davies
So Vile a Sin by Ben Aaronovitch and Kate Orman
Bad Therapy by Matt Jones
Eternity Weeps by Jim Mortimore
The Room with No Doors by Kate Orman
Lungbarrow by Marc Platt

Virgin Missing Adventures
Cold Fusion by Lance Parkin (Also features the Fifth Doctor)

Past Doctor Adventures
 Illegal Alien by Mike Tucker and Robert Perry
 The Hollow Men by Martin Day and Keith Topping
 Matrix by Mike Tucker and Robert Perry
 Storm Harvest by Mike Tucker and Robert Perry
 Prime Time by Mike Tucker
 Independence Day by Peter Darvill-Evans
 Bullet Time by David A. McIntee
 Relative Dementias by Mark Michalowski
 Heritage by Dale Smith
 Loving the Alien by Mike Tucker and Robert Perry
The Colony of Lies by Colin Brake (Brief appearance only; predominately Second Doctor novel)
 The Algebra of Ice by Lloyd Rose
 Atom Bomb Blues by Andrew Cartmel

Eighth Doctor Adventures
The Eight Doctors by Terrance Dicks
The Eighth Doctor visits the Festival of Britain and briefly sees the Seventh Doctor and Ace in Endgame
The Eighth Doctor dreams about the Seventh Doctor in The City of the Dead
Seen in the TARDIS mirror in Camera Obscura

Telos Doctor Who novellas
 Citadel of Dreams by Dave Stone
 Companion Piece by Mike Tucker and Robert Perry

Penguin Fiftieth Anniversary eBook novellas
 The Ripple Effect by Malorie Blackman

Comics

Doctor Who Magazine
A Cold Day in Hell
Redemption
The Crossroads of Time
Claws of the Klathi
Culture Shock
Keepsake
Planet of the Dead
Echoes of the Mogor
Tide and Time
Follow that TARDIS!
Invaders from Gantac
Nemesis of the Daleks
Stairway to Heaven
Hunger from the End of Time
Doctor Conkerer
Trainflight
Fellow Travellers
Darkness Falling / Distractions / The Mark of Mandragora
Party Animals
The Chameleon Factor
The Good Soldier
A Glitch in Time
The Grief
Ravens
Memorial
Cat Litter
Pureblood
Emperor of the Daleks
The Last Word
Final Genesis
Time and Time Again
Cuckoo
Uninvited Guest
Ground Zero
The Last Word

Doctor Who Magazine Specials
Plastic Millennium
Seaside Rendezvous
Under Pressure
Evening's Empire
Metamorphosis
Younger and Wiser
Flashback

Death's Head
Time Bomb

The Incredible Hulk Presents
Once in a Lifetime
Hunger from the End of Time
War World
Technical Hitch
A Switch in Time
The Senitel
Who's that Girl
The Enlightenment of Ly-Chee the Wise
Slimmer
Nineveh

IDW series
The Forgotten
 Prisoners of Time

Non-televised Seventh Doctor stories